Triaspis is a genus of braconid wasps in the family Braconidae. There are at least 110 described species in Triaspis.

See also
 List of Triaspis species

References

Further reading

 
 
 

Parasitic wasps